George Henry Forster (June 20, 1838 – November 8, 1888) was an American lawyer and politician from New York.

Life
He was born on June 20, 1838, in Charlestown, now a part of Boston, Massachusetts, the son of Henry Forster and Mary Taber (Swift) Forster.

He graduated from Harvard University in 1857. Then he worked for a railroad company and studied law, and was admitted to the bar in 1861, and practiced law in New York City. He eventually became a partner, with the law firm renamed as Weeks, DeForest & Forster. His office was located at 58 Wall St, New York. 

In 1867, he married Constance, the daughter of Henry L. Atherton. They lived in Riverdale, which was then an area in the Town of Kingsbridge, in Westchester County. The area was annexed by New York City in 1874, and became part of the 24th Ward, but continued as part of the 1st Assembly district of Westchester County until the next re-apportionment in 1879. Since 1898, it has been part of the Borough of the Bronx.

Forster was a member of the New York State Assembly (Westchester Co., 1st D.) in 1876; and of the New York State Senate (11th D.) in 1880 and 1881.

In 1882, he left the Republican Party, and joined Tammany Hall instead. He was President of the Board of Aldermen of New York City in 1888 and died two days after his re-election.

He died on November 8, 1888, at his home in Riverdale, of typhoid fever.

His son, Henry Atherton Forster (1868-1932), was a successful lawyer and historian from New York City.

References

Sources
 Civil List and Constitutional History of the Colony and State of New York compiled by Edgar Albert Werner (1884; pg. 291 and 376)
 DIED AFTER HIS ELECTION in NYT on November 9, 1888
 GEORGE H. FORSTER'S PLACE in NYT on November 13, 1888
 List of Presidents of the Board of Aldermen in New York City Mayors by Ralph J. Caliendo (2010; pg. 423)

1838 births
1888 deaths
New York (state) state senators
People from the Bronx
New York (state) Republicans
New York (state) Democrats
New York City Council members
Harvard University alumni
People from Charlestown, Boston
Members of the New York State Assembly
Deaths from typhoid fever
19th-century American politicians